Herbert Young Cho Choy (January 6, 1916 – March 10, 2004) was the first Asian American to serve as a United States federal judge and the first person of Korean ancestry to be admitted to the bar in the United States. He served as a United States circuit judge of the United States Court of Appeals for the Ninth Circuit.

Education and career

Born to Korean immigrants who worked in sugar plantations in Hawaii on January 6, 1916, in Makaweli, Kauai, Hawaii, Choy received a Bachelor of Arts degree in 1938 from the University of Hawaii. He received a Juris Doctor in 1941 from Harvard Law School. He served in the Hawaii Territorial Guard from 1941 to 1942. He served in the United States Army from 1942 to 1946. In 1946, Choy served in the Judge Advocate General's Corps. Choy was in private practice in Honolulu, Hawaii, from 1946 to 1971. He was the first person of Korean ancestry to be admitted to the practice of law in the United States. He served with the law firm of Fong Miho Choy & Robinson from 1947 to 1957, with one of his partners being future United States Senator Hiram Fong. From 1957 to 1958, Choy served as Attorney General for the Territory of Hawaii.

Federal judicial service

At the recommendation of Senator Fong, Choy was nominated by President Richard Nixon on April 7, 1971, to a seat on the United States Court of Appeals for the Ninth Circuit vacated by Judge Stanley Barnes. He was confirmed by the United States Senate on April 21, 1971, and received his commission on April 23, 1971. He was the first Asian American on the federal bench as well as the first Hawaii native. He assumed senior status on October 3, 1984. His service terminated on March 10, 2004, due to  his death.

Former clerk

In 2001, one of Choy's former law clerks, Richard Clifton, became the second judge from Hawaii to serve on the Ninth Circuit.

Death

Choy died in Honolulu on March 10, 2004, due to complications from pneumonia.

See also
List of Asian American jurists
List of first minority male lawyers and judges in the United States

References

External links
 

1916 births
2004 deaths
American politicians of Korean descent
Harvard Law School alumni
Hawaii Attorneys General
Hawaii lawyers
Judges of the United States Court of Appeals for the Ninth Circuit
United States court of appeals judges appointed by Richard Nixon
20th-century American judges
American jurists of Korean descent
American military personnel of Korean descent
United States Army Judge Advocate General's Corps
United States Army soldiers
University of Hawaiʻi at Mānoa alumni
United States Army personnel of World War II
Deaths from pneumonia in Hawaii